Ononis variegata is a species of plant in the legume family Fabaceae.

References 

variegata